Mancacocha (possibly from Quechua mankha  a gap deformed by continuous use, qucha lake) is a lake in  Peru located in the Junín Region, Jauja Province, Canchayllo District. Mancacocha is connected with the lake Chaquipaque (possibly from Quechua Chakip'aki for "foot fracture") southeast of it, situated at the foot of the mountain Chaquipaque.

References 

Lakes of Peru
Lakes of Junín Region